Marcus Dujuan McGraw (born October 5, 1989) is a former American football linebacker who is currently the Associate Director of Football Operations for the Houston Cougars.  During his college career at Houston, he was on the watch lists for the 2010 and 2011 Bronko Nagurski Trophy and Lombardi Award. He was signed by the Arizona Cardinals as an undrafted free agent in 2012.

High school career
Marcus McGraw played football for Bowie High School in Arlington, Texas where he also competed in wrestling and track & field. During his high school career, he was named to the All-District First-team and was also the District Most Valuable Player in 2007.  As a senior, he helped lead his team to a 13–2 overall record.  In addition to being recruited by Houston, he received scholarship offers from Buffalo, Tulsa, UNLV, Utah, and Washington State.

Professional career

Arizona Cardinals
McGraw was signed by the Arizona Cardinals as an undrafted free agent following the 2012 NFL Draft. He was waived on August 24, 2012.

See also
2008 Houston Cougars football team
2009 Houston Cougars football team
2010 Houston Cougars football team
2011 Houston Cougars football team

References

External links
Houston Cougars profile
Marcus McGraw recruiting profile at Rivals.com

1989 births
American football middle linebackers
Living people
People from Dallas
Houston Cougars football players
Arizona Cardinals players